The 59th Bodil Awards were held on 5 March 2006 in Imperial Cinema in Copenhagen, Denmark, honouring the best national and foreign films of 2005. Peter Mygind og Mette Horn hosted the event. Per Fly's Manslaughter won the award for Best Film. Best Actor in a Leading Role went to Jesper Christensen, the film's protagonist.

Winners

Best Danish Film 
 Manslaughter
 Adam's Apples
 Manderlay
 Murk
 Nordkraft

Best Actor in a Leading Role 
 Jesper Christensen
 Mikael Persbrandt
 Troels Lyby
 Thure Lindhardt
 Bjarne Henriksen

Best Actress in a Leading Role 
 Trine Dyrholm
 Birthe Neumann
 Sofie Gråbøl
 Signe Egholm Olsen

Best Actor in a Supporting Role 
 Nicolas Bro
 Lin Kun Wu
 Ali Kazim
 Nicolas Bro

Best Actress in a Supporting Role 
 Charlotte Fich
 Tuva Novotny
 Anne Sophie Byder
 Pernille Valentin Brandt

Best American Film 
 A History of Violence
 Brokeback Mountain
 Broken Flowers
 Good Night and Good Luck
 Sideways

Best Non-American Film 
 Der Untergang
 Sophie Scholl – The Final Days
 Spring, Summer, Fall, Winter... and Spring
 Vera Drake, Mike Leigh
 Wallace & Gromit: The Curse of the Were-Rabbit

Best Cinematographer 
 Manuel Claro – Allegro and Dark Horse

Bodil Special Award 
 Kim Foss and  Andreas Steinmann for NatFilm Festival

See also 

 2006 Robert Awards

References 

Bodil Awards ceremonies
2005 film awards
2006 in Copenhagen
March 2006 events in Europe